This list of the prehistoric life of Kentucky contains the various prehistoric life-forms whose fossilized remains have been reported from within the US state of Kentucky.

Precambrian
The Paleobiology Database records no known occurrences of Precambrian fossils in Kentucky.

Paleozoic

Selected Paleozoic taxa of Kentucky

  †Abrotocrinus
 †Abrotocrinus coreyi
 †Abrotocrinus unicus
 †Achatella
 †Achistrum
 †Achistrum ludwigi
 †Achistrum nicholsoni
 †Acidaspis
 † Acrophyllum
 †Actinoceras
 †Actinocrinites
 †Actinocrinites gibsoni
 †Agaricocrinus
 †Agaricocrinus americanus
  †Alethopteris
 †Alethopteris decurrens
 †Alethopteris lonchitica – or unidentified comparable form
 †Ammonellipsites
 †Amphiscapha
 †Amplexopora
 †Amplexus
 †Anchiopella
 †Anisophyllum
 †Annularia
 †Archaeocidaris
 †Archaeopteris
  †Archimedes
 †Archimedes communis
 †Archimedes compactus
 †Archimedes distans
 †Archimedes invaginatus
 †Archimedes lativolvis
 †Archimedes macfarlani
 †Archimedes meekanoides
 †Archimedes meekanus
 †Archimedes proutanus
 †Archimedes swallowvanus
 †Archimedes terebriformis
  †Asteracanthus
 †Athyris
 †Athyris fultonensis
 †Atrypa
 †Augustoceras
 †Aulopora
 †Aulopora tubiporoides
 †Aviculopecten
 †Aviculopecten germanus – or unidentified related form
 †Bellerophon
 †Beyrichoceras
 †Bisatoceras – tentative report
 †Bostonia
  †Bumastus
 †Calamites
 †Calamites cistii
 †Calamites undulatus
 †Callixylon
 †Calyptaulax
 †Camarotoechia
 †Camarotoechia mutata
  †Cameroceras
 †Cartersoceras
 †Ceratopsis
 †Ceraurus
 †Chasmatopora
 †Chonetes
  †Cincinnetina
 †Cincinnetina meeki
 †Cincinnetina multisecta
 †Cladochonus
 †Cladochonus beecheri
 †Cladochonus crassus
 †Cleiothyridina
 †Cleiothyridina hirsuta
 †Cleiothyridina sublamellosa
 †Climacograptus
 †Coenites
  †Composita
 †Composita subquadrata
 †Composita trinuclea
 †Conostoma
 †Constellaria
 †Cordaites
 †Cornulites
 †Crania – tentative report
 †Craniops
 †Cyathocrinites
 †Cyathocrinites glenni
 †Cyathocrinites multibrachiatus
 †Cyathocrinites parvibrachiatus
 †Cyclonema
 †Cydrocrinus
 †Cyphaspis
 †Cypricardinia
  †Cyrtoceras
 †Cyrtolites
 †Cystodictya
 †Cystodictya lineata
 †Decadocrinus
 †Declinognathodus
 †Declinognathodus donetzianus
 †Diplograptus
  †Dizygocrinus
 †Dizygocrinus whitei
 †Edmondia
 †Emmonsia
 †Endoceras
 Eocaudina
 †Eospirifer
 †Equisetum
 †Equisetum arvense
 †Eretmocrinus
 †Eretmocrinus magnificus
  †Favosites
 †Favosites arbor
 †Favosites biloculi
 †Favosites discoideus
 †Favosites favosus
 †Favosites hisingeri
 †Favosites niagarensis
 †Favosites proximatus
 †Favosites quercus
 †Favosites rotundituba
 †Favosites turbinatus
 †Fenestella
  †Flexicalymene
 †Flexicalymene meeki
 †Foerstia
 †Forbesiocrinus
 †Gastrioceras
 †Gilbertsocrinus
 †Glossina
 †Glyptocrinus
 †Glyptopleura
 †Gnathodus
 †Goniatites
 †Gravicalymene
  †Grewingkia
 †Grewingkia rusticum
 †Hallia
  †Hallopora
 †Halysites
 †Heliophyllum
 †Heliophyllum halli
 †Helminthochiton
 †Hindia
 †Holopea
 †Hyolithes
 †Idiognathoides
 †Idiognathoides sinuatus
 †Iocrinus
  †Isotelus
 †Isotelus gigas
 †Isotelus maximus
 †Kazakhstania
 †Krausella
  †Lepidodendron
 †Lepidodendron aculeatum – or unidentified comparable form
 †Lepidostrobus
  †Lingulella
 †Liroceras
 Lithophaga – tentative report
 †Maelonoceras
 †Masonoceras – type locality for genus
 †Maximites
 †Meristella
 †Meristina – tentative report
 †Michelinoceras
 †Murchisonia
 †Murrayoceras
 †Neospirifer
 †Neospirifer cameratus
  †Neuropteris
 †Neuropteris gigantea
 †Neuropteris heterophylla
 †Neuropteris tenuifolia – or unidentified comparable form
 †Oncoceras
 †Onychocrinus
 †Ormoceras
 †Orthoceras
 †Pattersonia
 †Pecopteris
 †Pecopteris plumosa – or unidentified comparable form
 †Pentagonia
 †Pentamerus
  †Pentremites
 †Pentremites tulipaformis
 †Periastron
 †Phillipsia
 †Phragmolites
 †Pitys
 †Plaesiomys
 †Platyceras
 †Platycrinites
  †Platystrophia
 †Platystrophia acutilirata
 †Platystrophia annieana
 †Platystrophia clarkesvillensis
 †Platystrophia clarksvillensis
 †Platystrophia cypha
 †Plectoceras
 †Pleurodictyum
  Pleurotomaria
 †Polygnathus
 †Polygnathus communis
 †Polygrammoceras
  †Proetus
 †Protosalvinia
 †Prototaxites
 †Pseudopolygnathus
 †Pterotheca
 †Quadratia
 †Scytalocrinus
 †Similodonta
 †Solenopora
 †Sowerbyella
  †Sphenophyllum
 †Sphenophyllum cuneifolium
 †Sphenopteris
 †Sphenothallus
 †Spirifer
 †Spirifer rockymontanus
 †Spiriferina
 †Stenaster
 †Stigmaria
 †Stigmatella
  †Strophomena
 †Strophomena concordensis
 †Strophomena costellata – or unidentified comparable form
 †Strophomena neglecta
 †Strophomena planumbona
 †Strophomena sulcata
 †Subulites
 †Syringopora
 †Taxocrinus
 †Tetradium
 †Theelia
 †Treptoceras
  †Triarthrus
 †Triarthrus eatoni
 †Triendoceras – tentative report
 †Trocholites
 †Ulrichicrinus
 †Whiteavesia
 †Worthenia
 †Zadelsdorfia – tentative report

Mesozoic
The Paleobiology Database records no known occurrences of Mesozoic fossils in Kentucky.

Cenozoic

 †Berhamniphyllum – type locality for genus
 †Berhamniphyllum claibornense – type locality for species
 Canis
  †Canis dirus
 †Diplotropis
 †Diplotropis claibornensis – type locality for species
 Equus
  †Mammuthus
 Microtus
 †Microtus xanthognathus – or unidentified comparable form
 †Platygonus
 Spermophilus
 †Spermophilus tridecemlineatus – or unidentified comparable form
 Taxidea
 Ursus
 †Ursus arctos

References
 

Kentucky